Hesar-e Shah Verdi Khan (also Romanized as Ḩeşār-e Shāh Verdī Khān; also known as Ḩeşār-e Ḩoseynī) is a village in Aladagh Rural District, in the Central District of Bojnord County, North Khorasan Province, Iran. At the 2006 census, its population was 1,040, in 258 families.

References 

Populated places in Bojnord County